SpaceStationSim is a space station simulation video game by American studio Vision Videogames. The game was developed with cooperation from NASA and the Japanese Space Administration. A PlayStation 2 version for the game was announced but never released.

Gameplay

SpaceStationSim is a life simulation game. The player takes the role as Chief Administrator of NASA.

Development
The game was in developed for 5 years with a team of 20 people from Vision Videogames, as well as over 30 contributors from NASA. Officially, the game was announced in September 2003 by GRS Games, the then predecessor of Vision Videogames.
GRS Games was an independent development company based in Towson, Maryland, that was working on the game. The company was acquired by Vision Videogames in March 2004 in a management buyout. The game's budget was $3 million but then raised to $3.5 million.

Reception

The game  has a 57% rating on Metacritic, based on 5 reviews. GameZone rated the game 7.5 of 10. The Space review praised the game, saying its one of the best contemporary space program-themed computer games for kids.

The game holds a 23% rating on Absolute Games.

References

External links 
 
Windows games
Windows-only games
2006 video games
Simulation video games
Single-player video games
Video games developed in the United States
Video games set in outer space
Cancelled PlayStation 2 games
1C Company games